This is a list of ice hockey players who have played only one game in the National Hockey League (NHL) from 1917–18 to the present. This list does not count those who were on the active roster for one game but never actually played, or players who played one or more games in the NHL's predecessor, the NHA.

Key

 Appeared in a Stanley Cup playoffs game
 Appeared in an NHL game during the most recently completed season

Goaltenders

Skaters

See also

List of NHL players
List of NHL seasons
Cup of coffee

References

One gamers